Callum Warburton (born 25 February 1989 in Stockport, England) is an English professional footballer who plays in centre midfield or occasionally at full back.

Career
Warburton began his career as a trainee with Rochdale, turning professional in the 2006 close season. He made his first team debut as extra-time substitute, for Adam Rundle in Rochdale's 0–0 draw away to Hartlepool United, a game which Hartlepool eventually won 4–2 on penalties. His league debut came in the 1–0 defeat at home to Peterborough United on 9 December 2006 and he remained in the side until the end of the year. Out of the side and in need of further first-team experience, he joined Northwich Victoria in March 2007, playing twice before returning to Rochdale.

He joined Kendal Town on loan in August 2007 and after failing to feature for Rochdale was released in January 2008 when he joined Kendal on a permanent basis.

References

External links

1989 births
Living people
Footballers from Stockport
English footballers
Association football midfielders
Rochdale A.F.C. players
Northwich Victoria F.C. players
Kendal Town F.C. players
Stalybridge Celtic F.C. players